The 2014 FINA Diving World Cup was held in Shanghai, China, from Tuesday July 15, 2014 to Sunday July 20, 2014. It was the 19th edition of the Diving World Cup, and the sixth time that it had been held in China. The venue was the Outdoor Diving Pool of the Oriental Sports Center.

The Chinese team placed first in all the events, and won the metal count.

Participating countries 
The number beside each nation represents the number of athletes who competed for each country at the 2014 FINA Diving World Cup.

Schedule 
As reported by FINA.

Medal summary 
As reported by FINA.

Men's events

Women's events

Team events

Medal table

References

External links 
 FINA Diving World Cup 2014

International aquatics competitions hosted by China
Fina Diving World Cup
FINA Diving World Cup
Fina Diving World Cup
Diving competitions in China